The Provisional Government of Cuba lasted from September 1906 to February 1909. This period was also referred to as the Second Occupation of Cuba.

When the government of Cuban President Tomás Estrada Palma collapsed, U.S. President Theodore Roosevelt ordered U.S. military forces into Cuba. Their mission was to prevent fighting between the Cubans, to protect U.S. economic interests there, and to hold free elections in order to establish a new and legitimate government. Following the election of José Miguel Gómez in November 1908, U.S. officials judged the situation in Cuba sufficiently stable for the U.S. to withdraw its troops, a process that was completed in February 1909.

An earlier occupation lasted from 1898–1902, from the conclusion of peace between the United States and Spain at the end of the Spanish–American War until the inauguration of the Republic of Cuba.

Background
The role of the United States in Cuban affairs, its responsibilities and prerogatives, derived from the Cuban–American Treaty of Relations of 1903, which Cuba and the United States had signed on May 22 of 1903, and ratified in 1904. Article III stated: It contained this provision:

The conflict between Cuba's political parties began during the presidential election of September 1905, in which Estrada Palma and his party rigged the election to ensure victory over the liberal candidate, José Miguel Gómez. The liberals orchestrated a revolt in August 1906. Both sides sought United States military intervention, the government expecting support in suppressing the rebellion and its opponents hoping for new, supervised elections. When Estrada Palma asked for U.S. troops, President Roosevelt was initially reluctant. He sent the Secretary of War William H. Taft and Assistant Secretary of State Robert Bacon to hold discussions in search of a negotiated resolution of the parties' differences. Arriving on 19 September, Taft and Bacon met with the leaders of both parties. When Estrada Palma recognized that Roosevelt was not prepared to support his position, he resigned on 28 September 1906.

Occupation
The day following his resignation, Secretary Taft invoked the terms of the 1903 treaty, established the Provisional Government of Cuba and named himself Provisional Governor of Cuba. The de jure or letter of the law character and scope of the U.S. provisional government was arguably set forth in the proclamation made by then Secretary of War and first provisional governor of Cuba, William H. Taft, which he made immediately upon the establishment U.S. provisional government on September 29, 1906,

 
On 23 October 1906, President Roosevelt issued , ratifying Taft's actions. U.S. officials ordered the United States Navy to land a brigade of marines. Under the command of Colonel Littleton Waller, they were to protect American citizens and patrol the island until the regular army arrived. The rebels offered no resistance and viewed the American intervention as a sign of success. The U.S. Army General Frederick Funston supervised the surrender of the rebels even before the army arrived. Funston resigned soon after though and was replaced by General James Franklin Bell.

On 6 October, the first army soldiers landed from the transport Sumner. The force was originally called the Army of Cuban Intervention but Taft renamed it on 15 October the Army of Cuban Pacification. The U.S. Congress and Roosevelt authorized the deployment of 18,000 men to Cuba for the expedition but the number in Cuba never exceeded 425 officers and 6,196 enlisted men. About half of the troops were from the 11th Cavalry Regiment under Colonel Earl Thomas and half from the 2nd Regiment, 1st Expeditionary Brigade. In one historian's account, the "Army of Cuban Pacification served as a strong moral presence on the island to encourage stability and obedience to the provisional government." Many of the officers were veterans of the Filipino War and exercised strict discipline to prevent serious incidents of misconduct. Since the rebels had already laid down their arms, the Americans focused on building roads and outposts. A total of 92 kilometers of new roads were constructed during the occupation and the army manned about thirty different posts in both the rural and urban areas, including Guantanamo Bay. Headquarters was at Camp Columbia, west of Havana. The military administration worried about their troops contracting typhoid, malaria and gonorrhea, and ten percent of the soldiers contracted a venereal disease during the occupation.

Most of the troops were stationed in Santa Clara Province, near the population centers and strategically deployed along railways, roads, and other shipping lanes used to transport sugar cane, the principal American-owned business ventures in Cuba. In anticipation of future political unrest and rebellion, the Americans organized a Military Intelligence Division (MID) to gather information about Cuban military capacity and resources available to government opponents. The MID prepared a list of names of all those who had participated in the revolt of 1906 and printed accurate maps of the Cuban topography. They also took detailed photographs for every strategic railroad bridge and waterway. Other troops reorganized and trained the Cuban Rural Guard (Guardia Rural Cubana), with an emphasis on improving discipline and morale and ending promotions based on politics. This effort had little impact, because the Cuban government decided to emphasize a reorganized and permanent Cuban army in place of the Rural Guard. Creating a stronger and permanent military force was controversial because it could serve the political interests of the party in power, but its proponents argued that only a permanent fighting force could ensure longterm stability.

On 13 October 1906, Charles Edward Magoon assumed the position of Cuba's provisional governor and he decided that the country was stable enough to hold elections. Regional elections took place on 25 May 1908, and the presidential election on 14 November, both supervised by the U.S. military. The elections took place without incident and José Miguel Gómez was elected. He took office on 28 January 1909. The U.S. troops were withdrawn over the following weeks, with the last American forces leaving the island country on 6 February 1909.

Assessing the operation, President Roosevelt praised its efficiency ("the swiftest mobilization and dispatch of troops over sea ever accomplished by our Government") and said it confirmed his support for organizing U.S. forces under the General Staff in the Army and the General Board in the Navy.

Baseball
During the occupation, the Afro-Cuban pitcher José de la Caridad Méndez faced the visiting Cincinnati Reds in December 1908. In a three-game exhibition series, he pitched 25 consecutive scoreless innings, including a five-hit shutout in the last game.

See also
 The Sugar Intervention, a third occupation
 Army of Cuban Pacification Medal

References

Further reading
 Lockmiller, David. Magoon in Cuba: A History of the Second Intervention, 1906–1909 (Greenwood Press, 1969). ISBN 978-0-8371-2210-6.
 Minger, Ralph Eldin. "William H. Taft and the United States intervention in Cuba in 1906." Hispanic American Historical Review 41.1 (1961): 75-89 online
 
 
 

1906 in Cuba
20th-century military history of the United States
1906 in the United States
1907 in the United States
1908 in the United States
1909 in the United States
Conflicts in 1906
Conflicts in 1907
Conflicts in 1908
Conflicts in 1909
Banana Wars
Cuba–United States relations
United States involvement in regime change
1907 in Cuba
1908 in Cuba
1909 in Cuba